John McNally (born January 20, 1956) is an American former sport shooter who competed in the 1984, 1988, 1992, 1996, and 2000 Summer Olympics.

References

1956 births
Living people
American male sport shooters
ISSF pistol shooters
Olympic shooters of the United States
United States Distinguished Marksman
Shooters at the 1984 Summer Olympics
Shooters at the 1988 Summer Olympics
Shooters at the 1992 Summer Olympics
Shooters at the 1996 Summer Olympics
Shooters at the 2000 Summer Olympics
Shooters at the 1999 Pan American Games
Pan American Games medalists in shooting
Pan American Games gold medalists for the United States
Pan American Games silver medalists for the United States
Pan American Games bronze medalists for the United States
Medalists at the 1999 Pan American Games
20th-century American people
21st-century American people